Fusinus was the name of a number of ships, including:

Ship names